Maksim Eduardovich Polyakov (born 18 May 1999) is a Russian football player. He plays for Torpedo Vladimir.

Club career
He made his debut in the Russian Football National League for FC Shinnik Yaroslavl on 11 April 2018 in a game against FC Sibir Novosibirsk.

References

External links
 Profile by Russian Football National League

1999 births
Living people
Russian footballers
Association football midfielders
FC Shinnik Yaroslavl players
FC Znamya Truda Orekhovo-Zuyevo players
FC Torpedo Vladimir players